Otford Palace, also known as the Archbishop's Palace, is in Otford, an English village and civil parish in the Sevenoaks District of Kent. The village is located on the River Darent, flowing north down its valley from its source on the North Downs.

The King of Mercia, Offa, fought the Kentish Saxons in 776 at the Battle of Otford.  In 791 (or possibly in the preceding year) Offa gave lands at Otford to Christ Church Canterbury (the ‘vill by the name of Otford’).  This was a very significant gift.  It meant that the Monastery of Christ Church Canterbury and subsequently the Archbishops of Canterbury became the Lords of the Manor of Otford.  The size of this piece of land was not recorded but further gifts of land were made in 820 and 821.  The first, by Coenwulf, the Mercian King and son of Offa and in the following year by Ceolwulf, his brother and successor, who donated to Otford lands bordering the East bank of the River Darent between Shoreham and today's Bat and Ball.  The second charter, in which Ceolwulf gives Wulfred, Archbishop of Canterbury, five plough lands consisting of two groups, one lying north-west of Kemsing and the other to the south-west,  can be found in the British Museum. 

A large moated manor house was built here and enlarged over the next 600 years by 52 subsequent archbishops. 
Until 1543, the palace was one of the chain of houses belonging to the archbishops of Canterbury.  In 1500, the Court Roll stated that Otford was, “one of the grandest houses in England”  In 1514, Archbishop Warham frustrated by the City Fathers at Canterbury to allow him to build a new palace there, added the North, East and West Ranges around a great courtyard.  The enlarged Palace predated that of Cardinal Wolsey at Hampton Court and was little larger in its extent.  Visitors to the Palace included Erasmus (a good friend of William Warham), Holbein, Cardinal Campaggio and King Henry VIII and Katherine of Aragon en route to the Field of the Cloth of Gold in 1520.

A survey (c1537) recorded that over the bridge is the forebay or forefront of the Galerye well edified and bilded of free stone with large oute caste of baywondows after an uniforme plan by all the Northe Part of the said mote, verye pleasunte to the prospects and view of the said sighte.  The hall was invironed aboute with Galeries and Towers and Turrette of Stone and the Chappell embatiled and parte covered with leade.

However, in 1543 Henry VIII forced Archbishop Thomas Cranmer to surrender the palace to the Crown.  Archbishop Cranmer's secretary Ralph Morrice was present in c 1543 when King Henry VIII visited Cranmer at Knole.  ‘I was by when Otteford and Knole was given him.  My Lord Cranmer mynding to have retained Knole unto himself, saied, that it is too small a house for his Majestie.  “Marye” (saied the King), “I had rather to have it than this house (meaning Otteford), for it standith of a better soile. This house standith lowe and is rewmatike like unto Croydon where I colde never be without sykeness.  And as for Knole it standith on a sounde parfait holsome grounde.  And if I should make myne abode here as I do suerlie minde to do nowe and then, I myself will lye at Knole and most of my house shall lye at Otteford.”  And so my this means bothe these houses were delivered upp unto the Kings hands, and as for Otteford, it is a notable greate and ample house, whose reparations yerlie stode my Lordew in more that wolde thinke.

After Henry's death, Elizabeth I showed relatively little interest in the Palace and eventually sold it to the Sidney Family who converted the Western side of the North Range into their private quarters.  However, the decline continued and, when the area was dis-parked in 17th century the buildings were used as part of Castle Farm.  In 1761, the North East Tower of the Palace was demolished and the stonework carried to Knole, Sevenoaks, where it was used to build Knole Folly which lies to the South-East of Knole House.

The principal surviving remains are the North-West Tower, the lower gallery, now converted to cottages, and a part of the Great Gatehouse. There are further remains on private land, and a section of the boundary wall can be seen in Bubblestone Road. There are many related buildings in the village, including a wall in St Bartholomew's Church dating from c. 1050.

Otford Palace is of exceptional significance for

•      The evidence which it provides for the form and architectural character of what was one of the outstanding buildings of early 16th century England.

•      Its archaeological potential to yield much more information about that building, particularly on the moat island, and its medieval predecessors.

Otford Palace is of considerable significance for

•      The evidential value of the adaptation of the north-west range by the Sidney family.

•      Its ability to illustrate the form and scale of a late medieval archiepiscopal palace, despite its fragmentary survival.

•      The aesthetic qualities, designed and fortuitous, of the north range building in its open space setting.

•      The contribution it makes to the character and appearance of Otford Conservation Area.

•      The insight it provides into the character and ambition of Archbishop Warham.

Otford Palace is of some significance for

•      As an illustration, especially with the archive material, of the struggle for the conservation of historic places during the 20th century.

•      Its contribution to the identity of Otford and its community today.

The Palace is now under the care of the Archbishop's Palace Conservation Trust.

References

External links
 

Tudor royal palaces in England
Christianity in Kent
Buildings and structures in Kent
Episcopal palaces of archbishops of Canterbury
Ruined palaces
Ruins in Kent
Brick Gothic
Gothic architecture in England